Lauro is a town in Italy.

Lauro may also refer to:

 Lauro, an ancient town in Hispania that has been identified by some historians as modern-day Lora de Estepa
 Antonio Lauro, a guitar player and composer
 Lauro (footballer, born 1973), Lauro Antonio Ferreira da Silva, Brazilian football goalkeeper
 Lauro (footballer, born 1980), Lauro Júnior Batista da Cruz, Brazilian football goalkeeper

See also
 Laur (surname)

Portuguese masculine given names
Spanish masculine given names